Faxaflói (sometimes Faxa Bay, Faxe Bay or Faxi Bay), is a bay in southwest Iceland, between the peninsulas of Snæfellsnes and Reykjanes.

Geography

The capital of the island, Reykjavík, is situated on its southern shore within the minor fjord Kollafjörður. From Reykjavik it is possible to see the peninsula of Akranes in the northeast and even the Snæfellsjökull at a distance of about 120 km (75 mi). This bay has few islands and the ones it does have are close to land, in particular contrast to the bay directly north of it, Breiðafjörður, which has the most islands of any bay in Iceland.

Islands in Faxaflói Bay near Reykjavík 
Akurey
Engey
Hólmar
 Lundey
Viðey
Þerney

History
Faxa Bay has always been a source of nourishment of the people living on its shore. In former times, fishermen went out in small boats to fish near the shore. Today the ships are much bigger, but have to go farther out to sea if they wish to catch fish. Just north of Reykjavík in Kollafjörður is the small island Viðey. In modern times, it has been uninhabited since 1943 but a former settlement has been proven from the 10th century onward. During the 12th century a chapel was constructed, and a monastery was founded in 1225, existing until the Protestant Reformation at the end of the 16th century. The island and the remains of the settlement can be visited by taking a ferry from Reykjavík harbour.

Name
The name Faxaflói means 'Faxi's Bay' or 'Faxe's Bay'. The first part, Faxa, is the genitive of the name Faxi or Faxe, referring to a man on one of the first Norse boat trips to the island.

References

Bays of Iceland
Southwest Iceland